NYRB can refer to:

New York Red Bulls, a soccer team
New York Review Books, publishing house of The New York Review of Books
The New York Review of Books, a literary magazine